Burbo Bank may refer to:

Burbo Bank Offshore Wind Farm, in the Mersey estuary
, a cargo ship built in 1902